Rashka Grashtitsa is a village in Nevestino Municipality, Kyustendil Province, south-western Bulgaria.

Region: South-Western planing region of Bulgaria
District: Kyustendil district
Municipality: Nevestino municipality
Latitude: 42.2069435
Longitude: 22.7786102
Altitude: 500–699 m
Distance by air to the capital city Sofia: 69 km
Area: 11.9 km2
Population: 147 people (31 December 2013)
Postal code: 2578
Phone code: 07913

References

Villages in Kyustendil Province